Patton Hill is an unincorporated community in the Indian Creek Township, of Lawrence County, Indiana.

Geography

References

Unincorporated communities in Lawrence County, Indiana
Unincorporated communities in Indiana